Hull is an unincorporated community in DeSoto County, Florida, United States, located  southwest of the city of Arcadia.

Geography

Churches
Mt. Olive CME founded 1912
St. Mary Missionary Baptist Church

References

Population 50 and counting

Unincorporated communities in DeSoto County, Florida
Unincorporated communities in Florida